Babulang is the largest festival of the traditional Bisaya community of Limbang, Sarawak. The festival showcases various music, songs, dances, colourful traditional costumes, decorations and handicrafts.

The festival includes a Ratu Babulang competition, and Water buffalo races.

References

Cultural conventions
Ritual